"Camera eats first" describes the act of taking a digital or smartphone photograph of a meal before eating, often followed by uploading the image to social media. The term refers to the photographer metaphorically "feeding" their camera before feeding themselves. Such photos are generally for personal use, such as keeping photographic food diaries, rather than for commercial purposes.

Background 

One reason for the rise of "Camera Eats First" is the rise of digital convenience. The global participation in social media is on continual surge with the advancement in technology and commonness of digital devices that serve as mediums for social media. The veteran food photographer of The New York Times, The Wall Street Journal and Saveur magazine Dave Hagerman mentioned that Instagram contains the most examples of "Camera Eats First" photos. This platform provides a way for people to share and indulge in their common obsession of food globally, thus encouraging taking pictures of food for personal use. More importantly, keeping a photogenic food diary is being treated as a form of self representation, showing who they are from what they eat in accordance to the quote of "Tell me what you eat, and I will tell you what you are," by the French philosopher and gourmand Jean Anthelme Brillat-Savarin.

Prevalence 

The "Camera Eats First" phenomenon is becoming more common all over the world with the emergence of smartphone and social media. After taking photos of their food, people will usually share the photos on social media such as Instagram, Facebook, Twitter and Pinterest. According to Webstagram, there are more than 180 million photos with the hashtag #food currently on Instagram. Other hashtags such as #foodporn and #foodie are often added to these photos. It is estimated that 90 new photos hash-tagged #foodporn are uploaded to Instagram every minute. The phenomenon is especially more prevalent among the younger generation. According to a survey done by News Limited, "54 per cent of 18–24 year olds have taken a photo of their food while eating out, while 39 per cent have posted it somewhere online. This compares with only 5 per cent of over-50s who say they share food snaps on forums such as Facebook and Twitter."

Positive effects

Increased connection and satisfying psychological needs 

Through sharing food photos on social media, users can form connections with other people and strengthen interpersonal bonds. Food is always a community event and a bonding experience which can bridge the gap between people and share joy. Thus, sharing food photos also acts as a  "social glue"  to gather people together to participate in each other's eating experiences. Through the sharing, a private dining experience is turned into a communal bonding activity. People can communicate and share their emotions with others, for example, happiness in a party.

In addition, people can satisfy the psychological needs of "belongingness and love" and "esteem" according to the Maslow's hierarchy of needs as they can share their experiences and show off to the world what they are eating.

Business opportunities 
Sharing food photos can facilitate people's obsession with food, but it can also help promote restaurants. Sharing of food photo can be a visual pull that will subconsciously alert people to check out new restaurants. Carmel Winery, a restaurant in Israel, gained $400,000 from free promotion by food photos on social media and successfully boosted its sales by 13% owing to the help of "Camera Eats First". On the other hand, some chefs in Hong Kong would take "food porn" photos and post them on social media because they thought that the "Camera Eats First" phenomenon served as a channel for them to collect feedback from customers which is vital information for them to make improvements to their dishes.

Making food taste better 

According to a study mentioned on Bit of News, taking photos of pleasurable food, such as cakes, before eating it can increase the savoring — "the increased anticipation built up from taking photos of the food made it taste better." If people don't take a photo, they may even feel something is missing from the savoring experience. In a study according to the Journal of Personality and Social Psychology, people who took photographs said that their food had been tastier than the group who had not. Trying to capture the perfect image to share it with others is the reason it tastes better. The study also suggested that the group who had taken photographs of their food expressed how enjoyable the entire experience had been because of it. The photographer rearranges the setup in order to take the best picture possible.

Negative effects

Impoliteness and worsening relationships 
While people are busy photographing their food and sharing it online, they will have less time to communicate with their friends and family. One of the functions of eating—enabling families and friends to gather together and enhance intimacy—is lost. The 'Camera Eats First" behavior may result in worsening relationships and weakening connection with others in contrast with the positive effect mentioned.

References 

Food and drink culture
Social phenomena